Charles Michael Cleveland (born September 18, 1980) is an American bluegrass fiddle player.

Early life
Cleveland was born in Henryville, Indiana. He was born completely blind and a childhood ear infection caused him to lose 80% of his hearing in one ear. He first learned to play violin at a local Suzuki program when he was 4 years old. His skill was recognized at an early age, with appearances on the Grand Ole Opry, A Prairie Home Companion and before the United States Congress in his early teens.

After graduating from the Kentucky School for the Blind he performed with various musicians including Dale Ann Bradley and Rhonda Vincent.

He currently lives in Charlestown, Indiana.

Awards
His first solo project on Rounder Records, Fire Holder, won the International Rock Music Association Instrumental Album of the Decade in 2003, and he shared the same award with Ben Jameson in 2005 for Tom Adams and Michael Cleveland Live at the Ragged Edge. His third award came for his 2006 album Let 'Er Go, Boys!.

Cleveland won the IBMA (International Bluegrass Music Awards) 2015 Fiddle Player of the Year and the 2010 Instrumental Group of the Year with his band Flamekeeper, for the third year. Cleveland had previously won Fiddle Player of the Year in 2001, 2002, 2004, 2006, 2007, 2008, 2009, 2010 and 2011.

In 2018 Cleveland was nominated for a Grammy Award for Best Bluegrass Album for his solo album, Fiddler's Dream. Two years later, he won in the same category with his album Tall Fiddler.

He is a recipient of a 2022 National Heritage Fellowship awarded by the National Endowment for the Arts, which is the United States government's highest honor in the folk and traditional arts.

Touring
In 2007, Cleveland and his band Flamekeeper entertained as part of the Bluegrass Sundays Winter Concert Series in Toronto, Ontario, Canada. The group performed at the Sally Creek Music Festival in Thames Centre, Ontario, in July, 2010.

In 2022, Cleveland joined Béla Fleck's touring band for My Bluegrass Heart.

Discography

Solo albums
 Sawing On The C String (self released) 1998
 Flame Keeper [Rounder Records] 2002
 Let Er Go Boys (Rounder Records) 2006
 Fiddler's Dream (Compass Records) 2016
 Tall Fiddler (Compass Records) 2019

With Tom Adams
 Live at the Ragged Edge (Rounder Records) 2004

Michael Cleveland and Flamekeeper
 Leavin' Town (Rounder Records) 2008
 Fired Up (Rounder Records) 2011
 On Down The Line (Compass Records) 2014

References

External links
Official website

Living people
American bluegrass fiddlers
People from Henryville, Indiana
Rounder Records artists
1980 births
Country musicians from Indiana
American blind people
People from Charlestown, Indiana
Blind musicians
20th-century American violinists
20th-century American male musicians
21st-century American violinists
21st-century American male musicians
National Heritage Fellowship winners